Yuhan University is a private college in Sosa-gu, Bucheon City, Gyeonggi Province, South Korea.  The current president is Kwon-Hyun Lee.  It offers technical training in a variety of fields.  The college's academic offerings are divided under five general divisions:  Mechanical Engineering Division, Electrical and Electronic Engineering Division, Design Division, Computer and Management Division, and Social Affairs Division.

History
Ground was broken for "Yuhan Technical Junior College" in late 1977, and classes began the following year. The first president was Chong Ryul Sohn. In 1979 it became Yuhan Technical College. In 1998 the current English name "Yuhan College" was adopted. The Korean name "Yuhan Daehakgyo" was adopted in 2011.

Founding Philosophy
The profit derived from a business enterprise should be returned to the society which nourished the growth of the business.
(The founder, Dr. New Il-han (Yu Il-han) believed that education is one of the most important ways that fulfill the above philosophy.)

School Motto
Be a freeman who dedicates himself to the peace of mankind.

Notable alumni
Sung Dong-il, actor

See also
Yuhan Corporation
Yuhan School
Yu Il-han
List of colleges and universities in South Korea
Education in South Korea

External links
Official school website, in English

Universities and colleges in Gyeonggi Province
1977 establishments in South Korea
Educational institutions established in 1977